Nong Han is a district (amphoe) of Udon Thani province, northeastern Thailand.

Geography
Neighboring districts are (from the south clockwise) Chai Wan, Ku Kaeo, Prachaksinlapakhom, Mueang Udon Thani, Phibun Rak and Thung Fon of Udon Thani province, and Sawang Daen Din of Sakon Nakhon province.

History
The Ban Chiang archaeological site has been a world heritage site since 1992. It was settled from the Neolithic to the Iron Age, and then abandoned from about 300 CE until the early-19th century. It is best known for its red painted pottery.

Mueang Nong Han was one of the four original subdivisions of Udon Thani, which were converted into amphoe during the monthon Thesaphiban administrative reforms in 1908.

Economy
Tambon Phak Top is to be the site of Thailand's largest biomass-fired power plant if plans by its owner, the Thai Appliance Industry PLC (Thaico) come to fruition. The 20 megawatt plant is facing significant local opposition. The plant would require the construction of six waste sorting plants not too distant to provide feedstock to the power plant.

Administration
The district is divided into 12 sub-districts (tambons), which are further divided into 161 villages (mubans). There are three sub-district municipalities (thesaban tambon): Nong Han, Nong Mek, and Ban Chiang. Each cover parts of tambons of the same name. There are a further 12 tambon administrative organizations (TAO).

Missing numbers are tambon which now form the districts Phibun Rak and Ku Kaeo.

References

External links
amphoe.com (Thai)

Nong Han